The Chung-Shan Building is part of the Sun Yat-sen Memorial Hall complex. Completed in 1966, the building is located in the Yangmingshan National Park in Taipei, Taiwan. The building is placed on the reverse of the 100 New Taiwan Dollar bill. The building was used as the meeting venue of the National Assembly and off limits to the general public until the National Assembly's suspension in 2005, and now serves as a location for hosting ceremonies by the President of the Republic of China for state visits and conferences.

History
In 1965, with a view to commemorate Sun Yat-sen's centennial birthday and to revive traditional Chinese culture, President Chiang Kai-shek appointed architect Ms. Xiu Zelan to design the Chungshan Hall. Thousands of military veterans finished this construction within 13 months.  Chungshan Hall once served as an exclusive convention site for the defunct National Assembly of the Republic of China, and an eminent locale for the head of state to receive distinguished foreign guests or host state banquets. Interiors at the hall are preserved as they were during the period in which it witnessed important scenes of constitutional development and historical events in the Republic of China.  The government has designated the Chungshan Hall as a historical monument.

Architecture
Chungshan Hall occupies a field of more than 130,000 square meters, and the building itself takes a dimension of over 18,000 square meters and 34 meters in height.  Situated in the sulfurous area of Yangmingshan, the structure is firmly founded on a ground base composed of mixtures of soft and hard soil, rocks and mud.  The Chungshan Hall is a rarity of large-size edifice in the world that is erected directly at a sulfuric-gas spurting pit.

The interior embellishments include over 400 hand crafted palace lanterns, mother-of-pearl inlaid furniture, ceiling, design of doors and windows, and color drawings of pillars.

Events
 10th National Congress of the Kuomintang
 12th National Congress of the Kuomintang

See also
 Zhongshan Hall
 Nanjing Great Hall of the People
 Great Hall of the People

References

External links

 https://web.archive.org/web/20100111060050/http://www.yatsen.gov.tw/chungsan/
 http://blog.xuite.net/rita5031/blog/28237632

1966 establishments in Taiwan
Historic sites in Taiwan
Tourist attractions in Taipei
Buildings and structures in Taipei
Government buildings completed in 1966